Cindy Corrine Dolenc (born 1976 in Toronto, Ontario) is a Canadian actress. She is best known for appearing in the television series La Femme Nikita as Kate Quinn.

Her first paid acting role she received while studying in London, England, where she was cast by Stanley Kubrick in Eyes Wide Shut.  She also appeared in the films Girl X,  Love, Lust & Joy, the television series Tracker, and TV film June. In 2005 she took a part in a two-act drama North Beach with the TrapDoor Ensemble, performing in Santa Monica. She lives in California.

Filmography

References

External links 
 
 
 
 

1976 births
20th-century Canadian actresses
21st-century Canadian actresses
Actresses from Toronto
Canadian film actresses
Canadian television actresses
Living people